Pfunds is a municipality in the district of Landeck in the Austrian state of Tyrol located 19.7 km south of the city of Landeck and 5 km north of the border to Switzerland. The village was first mentioned in documents in 1282. The main source of income is tourism.

References

Populated places on the Inn (river)
Cities and towns in Landeck District